Halee Fischer-Wright is an American physician and writer. She is the co-author of the bestselling, Tribal Leadership. Fischer-Wright is currently CEO of the Medical Group Management Association (MGMA).

Biography 
After receiving her Bachelor of Arts in Molecular, Cellular, and Developmental Biology from the University of Colorado in 1990, Fischer-Wright received her Medical Doctorate from the University of Colorado School of Medicine in 1994 and completed her residency program in Pediatrics at the Phoenix Children's Hospital in 1997.

Fischer-Wright had been the chief medical officer at St. Anthony North Hospital in Denver. She started as the president and CEO of Medical Group Management Association (MGMA) in 2015. Fischer-Wright is also a member of the Healthcare Leadership Alliance and the CAHME Board.

Fischer-Wright was chosen for her leadership and impact on the healthcare profession to be included in Modern Healthcare's Top 100 Healthcare Influencers in 2015. She was named to Modern Healthcare's Top 25 Women in Healthcare in 2017. Additionally, Dr. Fischer-Wright was awarded the Stevie Awards Maverick of the Year in 2016. In 2018, she was awarded 100 Great Leaders in Healthcare 2018, Becker's Hospital Review, Outstanding Women in Business finalist, Denver Business Journal, and Most Powerful Women in Healthcare IT, Thought Leaders, Health Data Management.

Writing 
Fischer is the co-author, along with Dave Logan and John King, of Tribal Leadership (2008). The book was a New York Times Bestseller as a paperback release in 2011. Tribal Leadership describes organizational culture and how to improve outcomes for both non-profit and for-profit organizations. Her second book is Back to Balance: The Art, Science, and Business of Medicine (2017).

References 

American women writers
American women physicians
University of Colorado alumni
Living people
Year of birth missing (living people)
21st-century American women